Willowdale is an unincorporated community in Kingman County, Kansas, United States.  It is located 5 miles north of Zenda at the intersection of SW 100 Ave and SW 90 St.

History
A Baptist church was organized in the community on May 21, 1885. A post office was opened in Willowdale in 1901 and remained in operation until it was discontinued in 1938.

Education
The community is served by Cunningham–West Kingman County USD 332 public school district.

References

Further reading

External links
 Kingman County maps: Current, Historic, KDOT

Unincorporated communities in Kingman County, Kansas
Unincorporated communities in Kansas